Wanted: Adventurers is a 1984 role-playing game supplement, written by J. Andrew Keith under the pen-name of John Marshal for Traveller published by Gamelords. Wanted: Adventurers is a book of short adventure scenarios.

Publication history
Wanted: Adventurers was written by John Marshal, and was published in 1984 by Gamelords as a digest-sized 48-page book.

Reception
Stephen Nutt reviewed Wanted: Adventurers for Imagine magazine, and stated that "The scenarios contained in this play aid are only skeletons. yet it gives depth to the referee's campaigns and allows off-the-cuff activity in play sessions."

William A. Barton reviewed Wanted: Adventurers in Space Gamer No. 72. Barton commented that "Most of the scenarios outlined in Wanted: Adventurers are intriguing hooks that a clever referee can turn into exciting adventure situations."

Reviews
 Different Worlds #47 (Fall, 1987)

References

Role-playing game supplements introduced in 1984
Traveller (role-playing game) supplements